

Female 
Pilar is a feminine Spanish language given name; traditionally short for "Maria del Pilar," it may refer to any of the following:

 Pilar Arlando (born 1989), Portuguese holder of the title of Miss World Singapore for 2009–2010
 Pilar Barbosa (1898–1997), Puerto Rican educator, historian and political activist
 Pilar Bardem (1939–2021), Spanish film and television actress
 Pilar Barreiro (born 1955), Spanish politician
 Pilar Barrios (1889–1974), Uruguayan poet
 Pilar Bastardés, Spanish actress
 Pilar Bayer (born 1946) Spanish mathematician
 Pilar Bosley (born 1988), American ice dancer
 Pilar Cabot (1940–2017), Catalan writer
 Pilar Calvo (born 1963), Catalan politician
 Pilar de Borbón (1936–2020), Infanta Pilar of Spain, Duchess of Badajoz
 Pilar del Castillo (born 1952), Spanish Member of the European Parliament
 Pilar de Lusarreta (1914–1967), Argentine author and critic
 Pilar Fuertes Ferragut (1962–2012), Spanish diplomat
 Pilar Geijo (born 1984), Argentine Marathon swimmer
 Pilar González i Duarte (born 1945), Spanish chemist
 Pilar Hidalgo (born 1979), Spanish female athlete
 Pilar Hidalgo-Lim (1893–1973), Filipino educator and civic leader
 Pilar Homem de Melo (born 1963), Portuguese singer-songwriter
 Pilar Khoury (born 1995), Lebanese footballer
 Pilar López de Ayala (born 1978), Spanish film actress
 Pilar López Júlvez (1912–2008), Spanish choreographer and ballerina
 Pilar Lorengar (1928–1996), Spanish soprano
 Pilar Manjón (born 1958), president of the association for the victims of 11-M (11 March 2004 Madrid train bombings)
 Pilar Mateos (born 1942), Spanish writer of children's literature
 Pilar Mazzetti (born 1946), Peruvian doctor who currently holds the title of Minister of the Interior
 Pilar Medina (born c. 1956), first Spanish delegate to win the Miss International title in 1977
 Pilar Miró (1940–1997), Spanish screenwriter and film director
 Pilar Montenegro (born 1969), Mexican Latin pop singer and actress
 Pilar Muñoz (1911–1980), Spanish actress of stage and film
 Pilar Muñoz, Spanish singer, member of the band Las Ketchup
 Pilar Nores de García (born 1949), Argentine economist
 Pilar Nouvilas i Garrigolas (1854-1938), Spanish painter
 Pilar Pallete (born 1936), Peruvian actress and third wife of the American film star John Wayne
 Pilar Paz Pasamar (1932–2019), Spanish poet and writer 
 Pilar Pellicer (1938–2020), Mexican film actress
 Pilar Rahola (born 1958), Spanish journalist, writer and former politician and MP
 Pilar Ramírez (1964–2017), Mexican synchronized swimmer
 Pilar Revuelta, Spanish film set decorator and art director
 Pilar Roldán (born 1939), Mexican fencer
 Pilar Rubio (born 1978), Spanish reporter and TV presenter
 Pilar Ruiz-Lapuente (born 1964), Spanish astrophysicist working as a professor in University of Barcelona
 Pilar Seurat (1938–2001), Filipina-American film and television actress
 Pilar Vallugera (born 1967), Catalan politician
 Pilar Zeta (born 1986), Argentinean artist, graphic designer, and fashion designer

Male 

 Pilar García (born 1896), Cuban Chief of National Police in 1958 and 1959

Fictional characters
 Pilar, from Ernest Hemingway's novel For Whom the Bell Tolls (also the name of his boat and nickname for his wife)
Pilar Estravados from Agatha Christie' "Hercule Poirot's Christmas"
 Pilar, from Paulo Coelho's novel By the River Piedra I Sat Down and Wept
 Pilar, from the musical Legally Blonde (musical)
 Pilar Cortez, from the ABC television series Last Resort
 Pilar Ortega, from the CBS nighttime soap opera Falcon Crest
 Pilar Lopez-Fitzgerald, from the NBC/DirecTV soap opera Passions
 Pilar Reed, from the SyFy television series Eureka
 Pilar Ternera, from the novel One Hundred Years of Solitude
 Pilar, a doll in the Groovy Girls line by Manhattan Toy
 Pilar Zuazo, from the Showtime dark comedy series Weeds
 Pilar, from Margaret Atwood's novel The Year of the Flood
 Pilar Dunoff, from Argentine soap opera Rebelde Way

Catalan feminine given names